Sebastian Hertner (born 2 May 1991) is a German professional footballer who plays as a defender for FC Teutonia Ottensen.

Club career

Early career
Born in Leonberg, Hertner started his career at the academy of KSG Gerlingen, before joining the academy of VfB Stuttgart in 2005. In the summer of 2009, Hertner joined VfB Stuttgart II for the 2009–10 season. Over three years, he made 65 appearances for Stuttgart II, scoring once. He joined FC Schalke 04 II in 2012, making 35 appearances in the Regionalliga West where he was the captain.

1860 Munich
After a season at FC Schalke 04 II, Hertner joined TSV 1860 Munich on a three-year contract. In a friendly match against FC St. Gallen in July 2013, Hertner tore a muscle in his left thigh, meaning he missed the first game of the season against FC St. Pauli. He made his debut for 1860 Munich, coming on as a half-time substitute for Grzegorz Wojtkowiak in a DFB-Pokal 4–3 penalties victory over 1. FC Heidenheim, following a 1–1 draw. Over the course of the 2013–14 season, he made 21 league appearances in the 2. Bundesliga, whilst he made just one league appearance in the 2014–15 season before leaving on loan.

Erzgebirge Aue
On 20 January 2015, Hertner joined 2. Bundesliga side Erzgebirge Aue on loan until the end of the season. He made his debut for Aue on 6 February 2015 as a 65th-minute substitute in a 2–0 victory over RB Leipzig. Despite their relegation to the 3. Liga, it was announced he would join Aue on a permanent basis for an undisclosed fee, signing a one-year contract with the club after making 10 appearances during his loan spell there. He scored his first goal for the club and the second of his career on 15 August 2015; a late penalty in a 2–0 victory at home to Stuttgarter Kickers. Having been an integral part of the Aue team that would eventually win promotion back to the 2. Bundesliga come the end of the season, Hertner signed a two-year contract extension with Aue in February 2016, which would keep him at the club until the summer of 2018. During the 2015–16 season, he made 31 league appearances, scoring once.

The 2016–17 season marked a return to the 2. Bundesliga for Erzgebirge Aue, though Hertner retained his place in the starting line-up, missing just two league matches all season. It was a largely unremarkable season for the club, finishing 14th and three points above the relegation play-off place. Hertner remained at the club for the 2017–18 season, though played a less vital role, starting just 16 games, in a season where Aue narrowly avoided relegation, finishing 16th.

Darmstadt 98
With his contract having not been renewed at Erzgebirge Aue, Hertner joined newly relegated 2. Bundesliga team SV Darmstadt 98 in the summer of 2018 on a two-year contract. He made his competitive debut for Darmstadt on 5 August 2018, coming on as an 80th minute substitute in a 1–0 win against Paderborn 07 in their opening game of the season. However, first-team opportunities for Hertner were limited and he made just 5 appearances in all competitions across the 2018–19 season. The 2019–20 season proved even less successful for Hertner since he appeared just twice for Darmstadt before being released by the club at the end of the season.

VfB Lübeck
He signed a one-year contract with 3. Liga side VfB Lübeck in September 2020.

BFC Dynamo
On 23 January 2022, Hertner joined BFC Dynamo.

International career
Hertner has appeared for the Germany under-18 team and the under-19 team, having made 14 appearances for the former and 5 for the latter.

References

External links
 

1991 births
Living people
Association football defenders
German footballers
People from Leonberg
Sportspeople from Stuttgart (region)
Footballers from Baden-Württemberg
Germany youth international footballers
VfB Stuttgart II players
FC Schalke 04 II players
TSV 1860 Munich players
FC Erzgebirge Aue players
SV Darmstadt 98 players
VfB Lübeck players
Türkgücü München players
Berliner FC Dynamo players
FC Teutonia Ottensen players
2. Bundesliga players
3. Liga players
Regionalliga players